The Etjo Sandstone is an Early Jurassic geologic formation in northern Namibia. Fossil theropod tracks of Prosauropoda indet., Theropoda indet., Tetrapodium elmenhorsti, Saurichnium anserinum, S. damarense, S. parallelum and S. tetractis have been reported from the formation, deposited in an aeolian environment.

See also 

 List of dinosaur-bearing rock formations
 List of stratigraphic units with theropod tracks
 List of fossiliferous stratigraphic units in Namibia
 Geology of Namibia

References

Bibliography

Bubliography 
 Weishampel, David B.; Dodson, Peter; and Osmólska, Halszka (eds.): The Dinosauria, 2nd, Berkeley: University of California Press. 861 pp. .

Geologic formations of Namibia
Jurassic System of Africa
Early Jurassic Africa
Sandstone formations
Aeolian deposits
Ichnofossiliferous formations
Paleontology in Namibia